The following is a list of the chief ministers of the South African apartheid era Bantustan of QwaQwa, also known as the Basotho ba Borwa.

Leaders of QwaQwa
Dates in italics indicate de facto continuation of office.

See also
Bantustan
President of South Africa
State President of South Africa
List of prime ministers of South Africa
Governor-General of the Union of South Africa
Apartheid
List of historical unrecognized states and dependencies

QwaQwa, Chief Ministers
QwaQwa